The Attic (also known as The Penthouse) is a 1962 Italian comedy film directed by Gianni Puccini.

Cast
Daniela Rocca as Silvana D'Angelo 
Tomas Milian as Claudio
Mary Arden as Gunilla 
Walter Chiari as Gabriele 
Philippe Leroy as Tommaso 
Lilla Brignone  
Gino Pernice

References

External links

1962 comedy films
Italian comedy films
Films directed by Gianni Puccini
Italian black-and-white films
1960s Italian films